Otto Wilhelm von Essen (19 April 1761– 9 June 1834) was a Baltic German in Russian Empire military service, also a statesman.

1832–1833 he was General-Governor of Governorate of Estonia.

References

1761 births
1834 deaths
Military personnel of the Russian Empire
Governors of the Russian Empire governorates
Baltic-German people